Kaweah Peaks Ridge is a spur of the Great Western Divide, a sub-range of California's Sierra Nevada.
The ridge is located in Sequoia National Park and is composed of mostly rugged and loose metamorphic rock.

Named mountains
There are several officially named peaks along the ridge:
 Black Kaweah (13,686+ ft / 4,172+ m)
 Kaweah Queen (13,388 ft / 4,081 m)
 Mount Kaweah (13,807 ft / 4,208 m)
 Red Kaweah, (13,726+ ft / 4184+ m)

Location
The peaks,  by trail from any road, are south of the Kings-Kaweah Divide, east of the Great Western Divide and, despite their name, are in the Kern watershed, not the Kaweah watershed. There are many high alpine lakes surrounding the peaks in Nine Lake Basin to the west and Kaweah Basin to the east. Visitors are rare due to the isolated location, but the Kaweah Peaks offer tranquil camping, fishing and high alpine mountaineering.  For the most part, the rock is loose and metamorphic.

References

External links
On climbing the Kaweahs. SummitPost.org.

Mountains of Sequoia National Park
Landforms of Tulare County, California
Ridges of California